Jakub Dohnálek (born 12 January 1988) is a Czech football defender who is currently free agent.

He has represented his country at youth level. He played in the 2007 FIFA U-20 World Cup.

Honours
Czech Rupublic U-21
FIFA U-20 World Cup runner-up (1) 2007

References

External links
 

1988 births
Living people
People from Vítkov
Czech footballers
Czech Republic youth international footballers
Czech First League players
SFC Opava players
FC Slovan Liberec players
FC Spartak Trnava players
Slovak Super Liga players
Expatriate footballers in Slovakia
Czech expatriate sportspeople in Slovakia
Association football defenders
Sportspeople from the Moravian-Silesian Region